"Sunset Hill", also known as the Alderson Home, is a historic home located at Alderson, Monroe County, West Virginia. The main farmhouse was built in 1880, and is a two-story I house with side gables and a two-story ell. The front facade features a gable portico supported by four Doric order columns.  Also on the property are a contributing cottage (c. 1900), privy built by the Works Progress Administration (c. 1935–1936), barn (c. 1900), cistern (c. 1880), and entrance gates (c. 1925).

It was listed on the National Register of Historic Places in 2000.

References

Houses in Monroe County, West Virginia
Farms on the National Register of Historic Places in West Virginia
Houses completed in 1880
Houses on the National Register of Historic Places in West Virginia
I-houses in West Virginia
Works Progress Administration in West Virginia
National Register of Historic Places in Monroe County, West Virginia
1880 establishments in West Virginia